Mickey Cohen is an American former professional soccer goalkeeper who played in the North American Soccer League and American Soccer League.

Cohen attended Long Island University where he played on the men's soccer team.  In June 1968, he was drafted by the St. Louis Stars of the North American Soccer League; however, he was not signed by the club. In 1971, he signed with the Connecticut Wildcats of the American Soccer League and remained with them through the 1978 season.  In 1976, he played one season for the Boston Minutemen of the NASL.  Cohen was also the starting goalkeeper for the U.S. Maccabiah Games soccer team for several years.

References

External links
 Profile on LIU Website
 NASL Profile

Year of birth missing (living people)
Living people
Sportspeople from Brooklyn
Soccer players from New York City
Jewish American sportspeople
American soccer players
LIU Sharks men's soccer players
Connecticut Wildcats soccer players
Maccabiah Games competitors for the United States
Maccabiah Games footballers
Boston Minutemen players
North American Soccer League (1968–1984) players
Association football goalkeepers
21st-century American Jews